Vologda I (previously known as Vologda-Gorod, sometimes stylized as Vologda-1) is a railway station in Vologda, Russia. It opened in 1872 and is located on the Northern Railway.

See also 
 Vologda II railway station

References 

Railway stations in Vologda Oblast
Vologda
Railway stations opened in 1872